In chemistry, the shielding effect sometimes referred to as atomic shielding or electron shielding describes the attraction between an electron and the nucleus in any atom with more than one electron. The shielding effect can be defined as a reduction in the effective nuclear charge on the electron cloud, due
to a difference in the attraction forces on the electrons in the atom. It is a special case of  electric-field screening.
This effect also has some significance in many projects in material sciences.

Strength per electron shell

The wider the electron shells are in space, the weaker is the electric interaction between the electrons and the nucleus due to screening. In general we can order the electron shells (s,p,d,f) as such

where S is the screening strength that a given orbital provides to the rest of the electrons.

Description

In hydrogen, or any other atom in group 1A of the periodic table (those with only one valence electron), the force on the electron is just as large as the electromagnetic attraction from the nucleus of the atom. However, when more electrons are involved, each electron (in the nth-shell) experiences not only the electromagnetic attraction from the positive nucleus, but also repulsion forces from other electrons in shells from 1 to n. This causes the net force on electrons in outer shells to be significantly smaller in magnitude; therefore, these electrons are not as strongly bonded to the nucleus as electrons closer to the nucleus. This phenomenon is often referred to as the orbital penetration effect. The shielding theory also contributes to the explanation of why valence-shell electrons are more easily removed from the atom.

Additionally, there is also a shielding effect that occurs between sublevels within the same principal energy level. An electron in the  s-sublevel is capable of shielding electrons in the  p-sublevel of the same principal energy level. This is because of the spherical shape of the s-orbital. However, the reverse is not true: electrons from a p-orbital cannot shield electrons in a s-orbital.

The size of the shielding effect is difficult to calculate precisely due to effects from quantum mechanics. As an approximation, we can estimate the effective nuclear charge on each electron by the following:

In Rutherford backscattering spectroscopy, the correction due to electron screening modifies the Coulomb repulsion between the incident ion and the target nucleus at large distances. It is the repulsion effect caused by the inner electron on the outer electron.

See also 

 Atomic number
 Core charge
 Effective nuclear charge
 Noble gas compound
 Steric effects
 Lanthanide contraction
 d-block contraction (or scandide contraction)

References

 

Peter Atkins & Loretta Jones, Chemical principles: the quest for insight [Variation in shielding effect]

Atomic physics
Quantum chemistry